The men's rope climbing event was part of the gymnastics programme at the 1924 Summer Olympics. It was one of nine gymnastics events and it was contested for the third time after 1896 and 1904. The competition was held on Sunday, July 20, 1924. Seventy gymnasts from nine nations competed. The event was won by Bedřich Šupčík of Czechoslovakia. Albert Séguin of France took silver, while August Güttinger of Switzerland and Ladislav Vácha tied for bronze. All three medaling nations were making their debut in rope climbing, so they were the first medals for each in the event.

Background

This was the third appearance of the event, which was held four times. The event had been held in 1896 and 1904 and would appear again in 1932. The event was an unusual one, not one of the standard apparatus competitions held at the world championships. The Official Report commented that it appeared some nations had considered the event less important than the other apparatus events on the 1924 programme.

The United States and Great Britain were the only two nations to have competed in one of the prior rope climbing competitions (in 1904 and 1896, respectively); the other seven nations all made their debut in the event.

Competition format

The rope climbing event was judged on time, with the fastest to reach the top winning. The times were also converted into points for use in the individual and team all-around scores, as the rope climbing was one of the 11 components of the 1924 all-around. Times of 9.0 seconds and lower were worth 10 points. Each  second slower reduced the score by 1 point, so any gymnast taking 12.0 seconds or longer would receive 0 points in the exercise.

Schedule

Results

References

 Official Olympic Report
 

Rope climbing